The Cicaré CH-2 was a helicopter designed and built by Augusto Cicaré in Argentina in the early 1960s.

Design
The CH-2 was a two-seat, single-engine helicopter whose airframe and tail boom was made from steel. The main rotor 3 three blades, and the tail rotor transmission was carried out through a shaft. The main transmission featured a 90° stage and belts stage.

Specifications

References

Helicopters